Ha-Melitz or HaMelitz was the first Hebrew newspaper in the Russian Empire. It was founded by Alexander Zederbaum in Odessa in 1860.

History
Ha-Melitz first appeared as a weekly, and it began to appear daily in 1886. From 1871, it was published in Saint Petersburg. Publication was suspended several times for lack of support or by order of the authorities. In 1893, Leon Rabinowitz succeeded Zederbaum as the editor.

Ha-Melitz was a representative of the progressive or haskalah movement, and even so severe a critic as Abraham Kovner admitted that it had been "more useful to the Jews than have the other Hebrew newspapers" (Ḥeḳer Dabar, p. 52 ff., Warsaw, 1866). While it was not so literary or scientific as some of its contemporaries, Ha-Melitz usually had more news and debates of interest, and was consequently more popular.

J. A. Goldenblum was for many years associated with Zederbaum in its publication. Abraham Shalom Friedberg and Judah Leib Gordon were the best known of its associate editors. Almost every prominent Hebrew writer of its times contributed to it.

Several collections of literary and scientific articles appeared as supplements to Ha-Melitz in Zederbaum's time: Ḳohelet (Saint Petersburg, 1881), Migdonot (1883), Melitẓ Aḥad Minni Elef (on the occasion of the appearance of No. 1,000; Saint Petersburg, 1884), Leḳeṭ Amarim (1889), and Arba'ah Ma'amarim (1893). Among similar publications issued by Zederbaum's successor were Ha-Yeḳev (Saint Petersburg, 1894), Ha-Osem and Ha-Gat (1897), and Ha-Gan (1899).

Ha-Melitz was intermittently published until 1903.

See also
Der Beobachter an der Weichsel, the first Jewish newspaper

References

 Online version.

External links
Online, searchable Hamelitz editions from the Historical Jewish Press

Newspapers published in the Russian Empire
Hebrew-language newspapers
Haskalah
Mass media in Odesa
Mass media in Saint Petersburg
1860 establishments in Ukraine
Jews and Judaism in Odesa